John McQuillan (1 September 1885 – 1941) was an English footballer who played in the Football League for Hull City and Leeds City.

References

1885 births
1941 deaths
English footballers
Association football defenders
English Football League players
Everton F.C. players
Hull City A.F.C. players
Leeds City F.C. players